Saurenchelys is a genus of eels in the duckbill eel family Nettastomatidae.

Species
There are currently 11 recognized species in this genus:
 Saurenchelys cancrivora W. K. H. Peters, 1864 (slender sorcerer)
 Saurenchelys cognita D. G. Smith, 1989 (Long-face wire eel)
 Saurenchelys elongata (Kotthaus, 1968) 
 Saurenchelys fierasfer (D. S. Jordan & Snyder, 1901) (Black-tail duckbill eel)
 Saurenchelys finitima (Whitley, 1935) (Whitsunday wire eel)
 Saurenchelys gigas J. Lin, D. G. Smith & K. T. Shao, 2015 (Giant duckbill eel) 
 Saurenchelys lateromaculata (D'Ancona, 1928)
 Saurenchelys meteori Klausewitz & Zajonz, 2000
 Saurenchelys petersi F. Day, 1878 
 Saurenchelys stylura (E. H. M. Lea, 1913) (Pillar wire eel)
 Saurenchelys taiwanensis Karmovskaya, 2004

References

Nettastomatidae
Taxa named by Wilhelm Peters